Governor's Mansion is a common term for the official residence of a governor. It may refer to: 


India 
 Portuguese Governor’s Mansion, Pondicherry

Philippines 
 Governor's Mansion (Bohol)

Russia 
 Governor's Mansion (Tobolsk, Russia), where Nicholas II of Russia was imprisoned

United States 
 List of official governors' residences in the United States

 Unofficial residences:
 Governor's Mansion (Marshall, Michigan), built in 1839, listed on the National Register of Historic Places
 Governor's Mansion (Shawnee, Oklahoma), built in 1903, listed on the NRHP

See also
 Old Governor's Mansion (disambiguation)
 Governor's Palace (disambiguation)
 Governor's House (disambiguation)
 Government House